New York's 13th State Assembly district is one of the 150 districts in the New York State Assembly. It has been represented by Democrat Charles Lavine since 2005.

Geography
District 13 is in Nassau County. It includes portions of the town of portions of the towns of North Hempstead and Oyster Bay, including Jericho, Glen Cove, Roslyn and Woodbury,

Recent election results

2022

2020

2018

2016

2014

2012

2010

References

13
Nassau County, New York